Hailun Road is an interchange station between Lines 4 and 10 of the Shanghai Metro, and is located in the city's Hongkou District. Towards anti-clockwise on Line 4, this is the last station before sharing with Line 3.

Places and tourist attractions nearby
 As part of the Shanghai Music Valley:
 The Theatre of SNH48 (Star Dream Theatre)
 1933 Old Millfun (slaughterhouse)

Station Layout

References

External links

Line 4, Shanghai Metro
Line 10, Shanghai Metro
Shanghai Metro stations in Hongkou District
Railway stations in China opened in 2005